The 2014–15 Liga Nacional Superior de Voleibol Femenino (Spanish for: 2014-15 Women's Senior National Volleyball League) or 2014-15 LNSVF was the 13th official season of the Peruvian Volleyball League. The defending champion, Universidad San Martín, reclaimed the league title championship defeating Géminis in the finals.

Competing teams

  Alianza Lima (ALI)
  Universidad César Vallejo (UCV)
  Circolo Sportivo Italiano (CSI)
  Sport Loreto (SPL)
  Géminis (GEM)
  Divino Maestro (CDM)
  Latino Amisa (LAT)
  Regatas Lima (CRL)
  Universidad San Martín (USM)
  Sporting Cristal (SCR)
  Túpac Amaru (TUP)
  Wanka Surco (WKA)

Competition format

First round
The first round is a Round-Robyn system where all 12 teams will play once against the other 11.

Pool standing procedure

1. Match points
2. Numbers of matches won
3. Sets ratio
4. Points ratio

Match won 3–0 or 3–1: 3 match points for the winner, 0 match points for the loser
Match won 3–2: 2 match points for the winner, 1 match point for the loser

Ranking

Matches

First Round, November 28 - February 01 
The first round consisted of 40 matches, with an average of six matches per week. Teams played seven matches during this round except for four teams that only played six.

Second round
The second round of the tournament will see the best 8 teams from the first round compete in another Round-Robyn system, according to the finishing will be the play-offs. It began February 11, 2015 .

Pool standing procedure

1. Match points
2. Numbers of matches won
3. Sets ratio
4. Points ratio

Match won 3–0 or 3–1: 3 match points for the winner, 0 match points for the loser
Match won 3–2: 2 match points for the winner, 1 match point for the loser

Ranking

Second Round, February 11 - March 15 
The second round consisted of 28 matches, with an average of six matches per week. Teams played seven matches during this round except for four teams that only played six.

Final round
The final round of the tournament is a knockout stage, teams play the quarterfinals seeded according to how they finished ranking-wise in the second round. The Final Round will begin March 27, 2015 and it is expected to crown the champion team ?. This round is played best-out-of-three games, for a team to move on to the next stage, they have to win twice against the opposite team.

Quarterfinals

1Regatas Lima won third leg 3-0 (25–20 27–25 25–23).

First leg

Second leg

Semifinals

First leg

Second leg

Bronze Medal Matches

1César Vallejo won third leg 3-0 (25–21 25–18 25–21).

First leg

Second leg

Gold Medal Matches

First leg

Second leg

Final standing

Individual awards

Most Valuable Player
 Cindy Rondón (Géminis)
Best Scorer
 Cindy Rondón (Géminis)
Best Middle-Blockers
 Sabel Moffett (Universidad San Martín)
 Andrea Urrutia (Universidad San Martín)
Best Opposite
 Maguilaura Frias (Universidad San Martín)
Best Setter
 Patricia Aranda (Géminis)
Best Outside Hitters
 Ángela Leyva (Universidad San Martín)
 Cindy Rondón (Géminis)
Best Libero
 María de Fátima Acosta (Géminis)
Best Server
 Shiamara Almeida (Sporting Cristal)

References

External links
LNSV
Voleibol.pe

2014 in volleyball
2014 in Peruvian sport
2015 in volleyball
2015 in Peruvian sport
Volleyball competitions in Peru